Stygobromus longipes, commonly called long-legged cave amphipod, is a troglomorphic species of amphipod in family Crangonyctidae. It is endemic to Texas in the United States.

References

Freshwater crustaceans of North America
Cave crustaceans
Crustaceans described in 1966
longipes
Endemic fauna of Texas